"2U" is a song by South Korean singer Kang Daniel. It was released on March 24, 2020 by Konnect Entertainment and distributed by Sony Music Korea. The song serves as the lead single from his second EP Cyan.

Background and composition 
The lead single's name is a play on the English meaning "going to you" and the literal Korean pronunciation sounding similar to the word "reason". "2U" contains a message to a weary or lonely person running after their dreams: There are those who stay by your side who love you because you are you.

"2U" was written and composed by Korean-American artist Chancellor with Kang in mind from the onset. Even during Chancellor's initial working stages with the song, Kang thought it matched him well. He described "2U" as a hybrid of pop and hip-hop genres with a "gentle and comfortable" sound well-suited for spring, and MTV News pointed out the single had "R&B flourishes" as well. Writing for IZM, Hwang In-ho described it as house track incorporating a synth-based rhythm, R&B beats and slow tempo. As part of Grazia Korea'''s May cover story, Kang was asked if there was a specific reason for choosing groovy title tracks such as "2U" despite others thinking of him as an artist with powerful, strong performances. He replied that he wanted to show what he is capable of step-by-step to heighten the sense of tension.

 Music video 
A music video teaser emulating a movie poster composition was revealed on March 20. The full music video directed by VM Project Architecture was released alongside the song. Doug Riggs, Caspar von Winterfeldt, and Brian Scott Robinson headed the US crew. It was filmed in one day at the Los Angeles Theatre. Kang found the filming location's inspiration and vibe to be well-connected to the song's concept and himself.

 Commercial performance 
"2U" is Kang's first top ten single on the Gaon Digital Chart, peaking at number 7. According to the Korea Music Content Association, Kang achieved a Gaon triple crown during the thirteenth week of 2020 in part due to "2U" ranking first in the download and BGM charts. Those sales were further reflected in the Gaon monthly charts for March 2020 with "2U" topping the download chart and ranking number 15 in the subsequent BGM chart. The song also took first place on five music shows: The Show, Music Bank, Show! Music Core, Show Champion, and M Countdown''.

Charts

Accolades

Music program awards

Release history

See also 
 List of M Countdown Chart winners (2020)
 List of Music Bank Chart winners (2020)
 List of Show! Music Core Chart winners (2020)

References 

2020 songs
2020 singles
Kang Daniel songs
Korean-language songs
Sony Music singles